The seventeenth election to Cardiganshire County Council took place in March 1946. It was preceded by the 1937 election with the scheduled 1940 and 1943 being postponed due to the Second World War, and followed by the 1949 election.

Candidates
27 candidates were returned unopposed, all but three of whom were retiring members. This resulted in 23 contests, the largest number since 1922. The contested wards included five of the six wards at Aberystwyth, where very few contests had taken place in the inter-war period. While the overwhelming majority of candidates stood as Independents, there were four Labour candidates. 

Eight aldermen retired, of whom four sought election.

Outcome

The new council was composed entirely of Independents, apart from a sole Labour councillor who won a seat at Aberystwyth. However, a number of long-serving councillors were deferred including three at Aberystwyth.

At Felinfach, Simon Davies, a retiring alderman, defeated Gwladys Davies of Llanllyr who had represented the ward since 1928.

Results

Aberaeron

Aberbanc

Aberporth

Aberystwyth Division 1

Aberystwyth Division 2

Aberystwyth Division 3

Aberystwyth Division 4

Aberystwyth Division 5

Aberystwyth Division 6

Aeron
}

Borth

Bow Street

Cardigan North

Cardigan South

Cilcennin

Cwmrheidol

Devil's Bridge

Felinfach

Goginan

Lampeter Borough

Llanarth

Llanbadarn Fawr

Llanddewi Brefi

Llandygwydd

Llandysul North

Llandysul South

Llansysiliogogo

Llanfair Clydogau

Llanfarian

Llanfihangel y Creuddyn

Llangoedmor

Llangeitho

Llangrannog

Llanilar

Llanrhystyd

Llanllwchaiarn

Llansantffraed

Llanwnen

Llanwenog

Lledrod

Nantcwnlle

New Quay

Penbryn

Strata Florida

Taliesin

Talybont

Trefeurig

Tregaron

Troedyraur

Ysbyty Ystwyth

Election of Aldermen

In addition to the 50 councillors the council consisted of 16 county aldermen. Aldermen were elected by the council, and served a six-year term. Following the 1946 election, there were eight aldermanic vacancies which were filled at the annual meeting. Those elected included only one retiring alderman and the first woman ever appointed in the county. 

The following retiring aldermen was re-elected:
D.R. Morgan, Bow Street

In addition, the following four new aldermen were elected:
Mrs C.M. Evans, Aberystwyth
John Williams, Goginan
Morgan Jones, Strat Florida
Josiah R. Jones, Llandysul
Rees Williams, Llwyndafydd
Capt D. Morgan, Llannon
David James, Llwyndyrus

The following retiring aldermen had been re-elected as members of the council but were not re-elected as aldermen:
Simon Davies, Felinfach

Of the newly elected aldermen, Josiah Jones had previously served as alderman from 1922 until 1934.

By-elections
Six contested by-elections were held following the election of aldermen.

Aberystwyth Division 3 by-election

Goginan by-election

Llandygwydd by-election

Llandysiliogogo by-election

Llansantffraed by-election

Strata Florida by-election

References

Ceredigion County Council elections
Cardiganshire
20th century in Ceredigion